XHCHH-FM is a radio station in Zumpango del Río, Guerrero, serving the state capital of Chilpancingo. Broadcasting on 97.1 FM, XHCHH is owned by Capital Media and carries an adult hits format known as Lokura FM.

History
The concession for XECHH-AM 650 was awarded to Luis Carlos Mendiola Codina in 1993. The next year, the station obtained its FM counterpart. Capital acquired XECHH/XHCHH in 2004. The AM station broadcast with 5,000 watts day and 250 watts night.

Capital Media surrendered the 650 AM frequency to the IFT in a letter dated June 25, 2019.

Like most Capital stations, XHCHH adopted the new Lokura FM adult hits format in 2020.

References

Radio stations in Guerrero
Radio stations established in 1993
1993 establishments in Mexico